Charles de Meaux (born 1967) is a French film director and contemporary artist.  His work combines fine arts and cinema.

Biography 
In 1997 in order to produce his first film, Le pont du Trieur (co-written with Philippe Parreno), he founded the production company Anna Sanders Films, with Philippe Parreno, Pierre Huyghe, Xavier Douroux and Franck Gautherot (both from the Consortium de Dijon), and then Dominique Gonzales-Foerster.

de Meaux's 's film works make extensive use of narration to explore the relation between reality and  fiction – particularly science fiction.  Landscapes also play an important role in his work.

de Meaux shows his films principally in museums and art institutions:
Le Pont du trieur, was shown in 2001 at the Centre Pompidou in the context of the Prospective Cinéma program.
Alien intelligence is coming from Earth (2002) has been permanently exhibited outside the walls of the New Media Museum of Busan in South Korea since 2007 as a video installation consisting of a very large screen installed in water.  
You should be the next Astronaut (2004), was presented by the New York institution, Creativetime and projected on a giant screen in Times Square in 2006.
Shimkent Hotel (2003), Death of Glory (2006) and You should be the next Astronaut, all three included in the piece titled Warning to the spectator, were shown at the Solomon R. Guggenheim Museum in New York in 2009.
Shin-ji-ke was presented in 2012 at the International Exposition in Yeosu, South Korea.  It is a particularly innovative sound and video installation, on a screen measuring 200m x 40m.
 Ghost train, sound and visual installation at Centre national d'art et de culture Georges-Pompidou, Paris.

de Meaux has co-produced all of the films of the Thai independent film director Apichatpong Weerasethakul, notably Tropical Malady (Prix du jury at the Festival de Cannes in 2004), Oncle Boonmee, who can recall his past lives (Palme d'Or at the Festival de Cannes in 2010) and  "Cemetery of Splendour".

Installations 

Stanwix, 2000
Alien intelligence is coming from Earth, 2002
You should be the next Astronaut, 2004
Death or Glory, 2006
Marfa Mystery lights, 2006
Garish sun, 2008

Full length films 

Le Pont du Trieur, 2000
Shimkent Hotel, 2003
Stretch, 2010

Main art collection 
 CNAP, France
 MoMA, New York
 New Media Museum, Busan

References 

Philippe Azoury, Géographies : interviews with Charles de Meaux, Éditions Manuella, 2010.
Pascale Cassagnau, Future Amnesia, enquêtes sur le troisième cinéma, Isthme Éditions, 2007.
Anna Sanders Films – The In-Between, "Catalogue" Collection, Éditions Les Presses du Réel, 2003.
"Anna Sanders Films, Cinéma et Art contemporain", Décadrage n° 13, October, 2008.

External links 
 
 
 Anna Sanders Films

Living people
French contemporary artists
1967 births
French film directors